The Pine Creek Baptist Church in Pinehurst, Idaho, also known as the Pinehurst Baptist Church, was designed by architects Tourtellotte & Hummel in "nostalgic log cabin revival" style, and was built in 1932.  It was listed on the National Register of Historic Places in 1982.

The church is built with full dove-tail joints at corners of its log walls.

It was listed on the National Register as part of a study of Tourtellotte and Hummel works.

It currently is the home of a nondenominational church, the Pinehurst Community Bible Church.

References

Baptist churches in Idaho
National Register of Historic Places in Shoshone County, Idaho
Buildings and structures completed in 1932
Log buildings and structures in Idaho